Lethbridge Park is a suburb of Greater Western Sydney, in the state of New South Wales, Australia. It is  47 kilometres west of the Sydney central business district, in the local government area of the City of Blacktown and is part of the Greater Western Sydney region.

History
Lethbridge Park takes its name from the Lethbridge family. Robert Copeland Lethbridge settled at Werrington on a land grant made on 1 January 1806, while his sister Harriet settled on the Dunheved estate. The district's two pioneering families were united by marriage. Harriet Lethbridge was married to Captain Phillip Parker King (1791-1856), son of Governor Philip Gidley King and Anna Josepha King. Robert Copeland Lethbridge married King's sister, Mary.

Education
Lethbridge Park Primary School is a public school covering Kindergarten to Grade 6.

Notable residents
Roy Courlander, British Fascist and later member of the British Free Corps SS Unit

References

Suburbs of Sydney
City of Blacktown